Schizovalva blumenzweigella is a moth of the family Gelechiidae. It was described by Henry Legrand in 1958. It is found on the Seychelles.

References

Moths described in 1958
Schizovalva